Paraleuctra alta, is a species of rolled-winged stonefly in the family Leuctridae. It is endemic to Alberta, Canada where it is found by the Berland River in Jasper National Park.

References 

Plecoptera
Insects described in 2009
Endemic fauna of Canada